Colegio de Geólogos is a professional association of Chilean geologists. Colegio de Geólogos awards since 1985 and every 3 years the Medalla al Mérito “Juan Brüggen”.

Its recipients are:

References

Professional associations based in Chile
Geology of Chile
Geology societies